is a Japanese former volleyball player who competed in the 1968 Summer Olympics.

In 1968 she was a squad member of the Japanese team which won the silver medal in the Olympic tournament.

External links
 Olympic report 1968
 International Olympic Committee medal database

1945 births
Living people
Olympic volleyball players of Japan
Volleyball players at the 1968 Summer Olympics
Olympic silver medalists for Japan
Japanese women's volleyball players
Olympic medalists in volleyball
Asian Games medalists in volleyball
Volleyball players at the 1970 Asian Games
Medalists at the 1970 Asian Games
Asian Games gold medalists for Japan
Medalists at the 1968 Summer Olympics
20th-century Japanese women